Aleksandar Strain (5 April 1919 – 15 December 1997) was a Yugoslav cyclist. He competed in the individual and team road race events at the 1948 Summer Olympics.

References

External links
 

1919 births
1997 deaths
Yugoslav male cyclists
Olympic cyclists of Yugoslavia
Cyclists at the 1948 Summer Olympics
People from Muggia
Cyclists from Friuli Venezia Giulia